Serine active site-containing protein 1, or Protein SERAC1 is a protein in humans that is encoded by the SERAC1 gene. The protein encoded by this gene is a phosphatidylglycerol remodeling protein found at the interface of mitochondria and endoplasmic reticula, where it mediates phospholipid exchange. The encoded protein plays a major role in mitochondrial function and intracellular cholesterol trafficking. Defects in this gene are a cause of 3-methylglutaconic aciduria with deafness, encephalopathy, and Leigh-like syndrome (MEGDEL). Two transcript variants, one protein-coding and the other non-protein coding, have been found for this gene.

Structure 
The SERAC1 gene is located on the q arm of chromosome 6 at position 25.3 and it spans 58,776 base pairs. The SERAC1 gene produces an 18.7 kDa protein composed of 162 amino acids. The structure of the encoded protein contains a C-terminal serine-lipase/esterase domain containing the consensus lipase motif GxSxG, and an N-terminal signal sequence.

Function 
The SERAC1 gene encodes for a protein necessary for phosphatidylglycerol remodeling. phosphatidylglycerol remodeling is a process of altering or remodeling a particular phospholipid called phosphatidylglycerol. Phosphatidylglycerol helps make cardiolipin, an important ingredient that surrounds the Inner mitochondrial membrane. Cardiolipin is responsible for converting energy acquired from food to a cell-usable form and required for proper mitochondrial function. Because of cardiolipin, the remodeling process of phosphatidylglycerol is essential for mitochondrial function and intracellular cholesterol trafficking.

Additionally, SERAC1 is involved in the movement of cholesterol, which are fatty, waxy substances within cells. Cholesterol is a component of cell structure, and produces hormones and digestive acids. The protein may also be involved in the transacylation-acylation reaction to produce phosphatidylglycerol-36:1 and bis(monoacylglycerol)phosphate biosynthetic pathway.

Clinical Significance 
Mutations in the SERAC1 gene have been associated to impairment of both mitochondrial function and intracellular cholesterol trafficking. Such mutations have been majorly associated withand Leigh syndrome and 3-methylglutaconic aciduria with deafness, encephalopathy, and Leigh-like syndrome, known as MEGDEL syndrome.

MEGDEL syndrome
SERAC1 mutations have been heavily associated with MGDEL syndrome. MGDEL syndrome (3-methylglutaconic aciduria with deafness, encephalopathy, and Leigh-like syndrome) is an autosomal recessive disorder characterized by childhood onset of delayed psychomotor development or psychomotor regression, sensorineural deafness, spasticity or dystonia and increased excretion of 3-methylglutaconic acid. Brain imaging shows cerebral and cerebellar atrophy as well as lesions in the basal ganglia reminiscent of Leigh syndrome. Laboratory studies show increased serum lactate and alanine, mitochondrial oxidative phosphorylation defects, abnormal mitochondria, abnormal phosphatidylglycerol and cardiolipin profiles in fibroblasts, and abnormal accumulation of unesterified cholesterol within cells.

The SERAC1 gene mutations that cause this condition reduce the amount of SERAC1 protein that is produced or lead to production of a protein with little or no function. As a result, phosphatidylglycerol remodeling is impaired, which likely alters the composition of cardiolipin. Researchers speculate that the abnormal cardiolipin affects mitochondrial function, reducing cellular energy production and leading to the neurological and hearing problems characteristic of MEGDEL syndrome. It is unclear how SERAC1 gene mutations lead to abnormal release of 3-methylglutaconic acid in the urine.

A c.202C>T mutation in this gene has been found in a patient suffering from 3-methylglutaconic aciduria, and related symptoms. Two patients with Homozygous G>C transversions in the SERAC1 gene have been found to show symptoms of MEGDEL syndrome with deafness, encephalopathy, and Leigh-like syndrome. Another patient with a homozygous 4 base pair deletion (1167delTCAG) showed symptoms of recurrent infections, failure to thrive, mental retardation, spasticity and extrapyramidal symptoms.

Leigh syndrome
Leigh syndrome is an early-onset progressive neurodegenerative disorder characterized by the presence of focal, bilateral lesions in one or more areas of the central nervous system including the brainstem, thalamus, basal ganglia, cerebellum and spinal cord. Clinical features depend on which areas of the central nervous system are involved and include subacute onset of psychomotor retardation, hypotonia, ataxia, muscle weakness, vision loss, eye movement abnormalities, seizures, and dysphagia.

Interactions 

SERAC1 has been shown to have Protein-protein interactions with the following.

 SDF4
 EFGR
 APP
 SLC18A1
 LPAR4
 CBWD1

References